Berneck may refer to:

Berneck, St. Gallen, a municipality in the canton of St. Gallen, Switzerland
Bad Berneck im Fichtelgebirge, a spa town in Bavaria, Germany
Berneck (river), a river in Baden-Württemberg, Germany
Berneck Castle, a castle near the village of Kauns, Austria
Christopher Berneck (born 1992), German figure skater